François-Annibal d'Estrées, duc d'Estrées (1573 – 5 May 1670) was a French diplomat, soldier and Marshal of France.

Biography

François-Annibal d'Estrées was the son of Antoine d'Estrées and Françoise Babou de La Bourdaisière, and the brother of Gabrielle d'Estrées, mistress of Henry IV of France and Julienne-Hippolite-Joséphine, Duchess of Villars. His first title was that of a marquis de Cœuvres. He was destined for the church but preferred a military career and joined the army where he became Lieutenant General.

In 1624, under Marie de' Medici, he was given supreme command over the troops of France, Venice and Savoy in the conquest of Valtellina. For this, he was given in 1626 the title of a Marshal of France. In 1630 he tried in vain to conquer Mantua. In 1632 he was put in command of the Army of the Rhine and took Trier.

After his military career, he became a diplomat.

Between 1636 and 1648 he was the French envoy in Rome. After this Louis XIV promoted him to the Dukedom of Estrées. François-Annibal was appointed Governor of Île de France and later Soissons. 

His son Jean II d'Estrées and his grandson Victor-Marie d'Estrées also reached the rank of Marshal of France. 

With his first wife, Marie de Béthune, he had two children:
 Jean II d'Estrées
 César d'Estrées.

With his second wife, Anne Haber, he had a daughter:
 Christine d'Estrées

References

1573 births
1670 deaths
 1
Marshals of France
Peers created by Louis XIV
17th-century peers of France